The Danish language is the official language in Denmark. In the Faroe Islands, the Faroese language and the Danish language are the official languages, and both must be taught in schools. Danish should be used in court, but Faroese can be used in all other official places. The Greenlandic language is the official language in Greenland, and Greenland's Home Rule Act of 2009 does not require Danish to be taught or the use of Danish for official purposes. In accordance with Denmark's official monolingualism, all official documents and communications are in Danish.

History

Throughout much of its history, Denmark has been home to a population of Low German speakers in many of its towns, including the capital, Copenhagen. Rural settlers known as "potato Germans" and "beet Poles" also brought their own languages to Danish farms. During the 17th, 18th and 19th centuries, Dutch was spoken among descendants of Dutch/Flemish settlers on the island of Amager (Dragør, Store Magleby and Christianshavn). In its heyday, the Royal Danish Navy was composed largely of Norwegian speakers. Additionally, North Frisian was spoken on the North Frisian Islands. During the 19th century, German Jews brought the Yiddish language to Copenhagen and a few other towns, and in the early 20th century, an influx of Russian Jews gave this language a brief revival. 

However, subsequent generations of all these groups have overwhelmingly abandoned their ancestral languages and assimilated into the general population.

Protection
Framework Convention for the Protection of National Minorities entered into force in Denmark on 1 February 1998 while European Charter for Regional or Minority Languages entered into force on 1 January 2001.

Languages

English
The English language is spoken by most Danes. Like most other Scandinavian countries, English is mandatory in Danish schools. In a 2012 survey, 86% of Danes spoke English.

German

North Schleswig Germans‘ language rights are protected by the Copenhagen-Bonn Declarations of 1955. Outside the minority area German is used by members of St. Peter's parish in Copenhagen. 24 German kindergartens and 18 German schools are maintained by the German School and Language Association. Although the European Charter for Regional or Minority Languages stipulates the right of the German minority to use their own forms of geographical names, no steps have been taken in this direction.

Greenlandic and Faeroese languages
First-generation Greenlanders in Denmark and Faroese in Denmark tend to speak their own languages, rather than Danish.

Romani
In 2011 Committee of Ministers of Council of Europe recommended that the Danish authorities clarify the issue of the traditional presence of the Romani language in country. The authorities responded that they have reviewed multiple sources and tried also to obtain information by contacting universities in Scandinavia, but did not find any documentation in support of the traditional presence of the Romani language in Denmark. During the on-the-spot visit, the Committee of Experts met with a representative of the Romani People who argued that there are around 5,000 people still living in Denmark who might be considered descendants of ten Sinti families that came from Schleswig-Holstein in the 19th century.

References 

Languages of Denmark
Denmark